Ivanauskiella psamathias is a moth of the family Gelechiidae. It is found in Bulgaria, Russia (southern Ural, Volga-Don region, southern Siberia), Ukraine, Mongolia, Turkmenistan and North Africa.

References

Moths described in 1895
Anomologini